Alikhan Aslanovich Shavayev (born 5 January 1993) is a Russian football midfielder who plays as central midfielder for FC Rotor Volgograd.

Club career
He made his debut in the Russian National Football League for PFC Spartak Nalchik on 6 August 2012 in a game against FC Ural Sverdlovsk Oblast.

He made his Russian Premier League debut for FC Amkar Perm on 23 August 2014 in a game against FC Zenit Saint Petersburg.

On 5 December 2022, Shavayev's contract with FC Fakel Voronezh was terminated by mutual consent.

Personal life
He is the younger brother of Amirkhan Shavayev.

Career statistics

Club

References

External links
 
 
 

1993 births
Sportspeople from Nalchik
Living people
Russian footballers
Association football midfielders
PFC Spartak Nalchik players
FC Amkar Perm players
FC Baltika Kaliningrad players
FC Fakel Voronezh players
FC Rotor Volgograd players
Russian Premier League players
Russian First League players